Joseph P. Eller House is a historic home located at Weaverville, Buncombe County, North Carolina. It was built about 1880, and is a two-story, frame I-house dwelling. It consists of a two-story main block with two-story portico and two-story rear ell.  Also on the property are a contributing spring house and barn.

It was listed on the National Register of Historic Places in 2004.

References

Houses on the National Register of Historic Places in North Carolina
Houses completed in 1880
Houses in Buncombe County, North Carolina
National Register of Historic Places in Buncombe County, North Carolina